Jordan Mark Chapell (born 8 September 1991) is an English professional footballer who plays for Matlock Town as a forward. Born in Sheffield, he started his career with his hometown club Sheffield United from where he had loan spells at Burton Albion and Torquay United, who he subsequently joined on a permanent basis.

Playing career

Sheffield United
Chapell began his career at Sheffield United, making his first team début in the League Cup First Round 2–0 defeat by Hartlepool United at the Victoria Park in August 2010. In January 2011 he agreed a contract extension to keep him with the club until the end of the 2011–12 season. After a successful season in the reserves Chapell was handed another new contract in July 2012 to keep him with United for a further twelve months.

The following season Chapell was on the fringes of the United first team, and in October 2012 he agreed a months loan to Burton Albion to gain more first team experience. Chapell made his Albion début later that evening against Port Vale as a 70-minute substitute, scoring only three minutes after coming onto the pitch. He made his first start for Burton Albion in an FA Cup fixture against Altrincham which resulted in a 3–3 draw. With the Blades suffering injury problems Chapell was recalled early from his loan at the start of December, leaving Burton after having made four appearances and scored one goal. After making his first league appearance for United in December 2012, Chapell was loaned out once more in March, moving to Torquay United until the end of the season. He made his Torquay début a few days later, in a 1–1 draw against Southend United at Roots Hall, providing the assist for Joss Labadie's goal. On 12 April 2013 Sheffield United's caretaker manager Chris Morgan recalled Chapell from his loan spell, and he returned to United having played six times for Torquay. The following June Chapell extended his contract with the Blades once more.

Torquay United
Despite recently agreeing a new deal with Sheffield United, Chapell signed a two-year contract with former loan club Torquay United on 9 July 2013, the Blades allowing him to leave on a free transfer with the promise of a future sell-on payment. Having made his debut in the opening game of the season, Chapell became a regular in the Torquay line up and had scored three goals by the end of August, including two goals in six minutes against Northampton Town.

On 25 March 2015, Chapell joined Conference Premier side Grimsby Town on loan until the end of the season.

Non-league 
In July 2015, Chapell signed for Chester. In November 2017 he joined Stalybridge Celtic on loan. He scored a hat-trick for the Celts in a 5–2 league victory over Lancaster City. He returned to Chester in February 2018, but left the club by mutual consent one month later.

In June 2018, he signed for Matlock Town. In July 2019, he joined Sheffield FC.

Career statistics

References

External links
Profile at the Official Sheffield United site

1991 births
Living people
Footballers from Sheffield
English footballers
Association football wingers
Association football forwards
Sheffield United F.C. players
Burton Albion F.C. players
Torquay United F.C. players
Grimsby Town F.C. players
Chester F.C. players
English Football League players
Stalybridge Celtic F.C. players
Matlock Town F.C. players
Sheffield F.C. players